Yin Yin Oo is a Burmese diplomat and a member of the Advisory Board of the State Administration Council (SAC). She previously served as the deputy director-general of International Organizations and Economic Department of the Foreign Ministry of Myanmar under President Thein Sein's administration. She retired in 2016 before Aung San Suu Kyi took office. She is the daughter of former president Maung Maung.

On 9 February 2009, WikiLeaks provided documents reporting on a meeting between US diplomats and Yin Yin Oo, where she advocated for improving Myanmar-United States relations through anti-narcotics cooperation and recovery of US remains from World War II.

References

Burmese diplomats
Year of birth missing (living people)
Living people